"Crying Out Your Name" is a song performed by Swedish pop singer and music producer Loreen, it was released as the fourth single from her debut studio album Heal (2012). The song was written by Moh Denebi, Ana Diaz, Nick Jarl, Gino Yonan, Svante Halldin, Jakob Hazell and produced by SeventyEight. It was released as a digital download on 8 October 2012 in Sweden. The song debuted at number 42 on the Swedish Singles Chart and peaked at 19.

Critical reception
This song was met with critical acclaim. Musicperk.com rated the song 8/10 quoting "Pretty great track indeed" Scandipop.co.uk lauded the song with "(n)ever dips below being a 9.5 out of 10 moment, not even for a second." David Lim was impressed "splendid, with its percolating synths and drum ‘n’ bass beats – is such a relatable self-destructive break up track. It totally got me with its raw flares of frustration and desperation." Higher Plain Music called the chorus of this song "epic." EscXtra praised the song by calling it one of favorites of album due to "the excellent vocal in the chorus as well as the beat of the track."

Track listing
Digital download
1. Crying Out Your Name" - 3:38

Promo Remixes
 "Crying Out Your Name (Promise Land Remix) 5:52			
 "Crying Out Your Name (K-Klass Remix) 6:31		
 "Crying Out Your Name (Lucas Nord Remix) 5:41	
 "Crying Out Your Name (Albin Myer Remix) 4:50			
 "Crying Out Your Name (Bauer & Landford Remix) 5:31			
 "Crying Out Your Name (Lucas Nord Remix Radio Edit) 3:44

Credits and personnel
 Lead vocals – Loreen
 Producers – SeventyEight
 Lyrics – Moh Denebi, Ana Diaz, Niklas Jarl, Gino Yonan, Svante Halldin, Jakob Hazell
 Label: Warner Music Sweden

Chart performance

Release history

References

2012 singles
2012 songs
Loreen (singer) songs
Songs written by Svante Halldin
Songs written by Jakob Hazell
Song recordings produced by Jack & Coke
Songs written by Moh Denebi
Songs written by Nick Jarl
Warner Music Group singles
Synth-pop ballads